Charles Eugene "Truck" Eagan (August 10, 1877 – March 19, 1949) was a Major League Baseball infielder who played in 1901 with the Pittsburgh Pirates and the Cleveland Blues. He batted and threw right-handed. Eagan had a .133 career batting average.

For his long career in the minor leagues, where he had 1,830 hits and 105 home runs, Eagan was elected to the Pacific Coast League Hall of Fame.

He was born and died in San Francisco, California.

External links

1877 births
1949 deaths
Major League Baseball infielders
Pittsburgh Pirates players
Cleveland Blues (1901) players
Baseball players from California
San Francisco Athletics players
Sacramento Gilt Edges players
San Jose Brewers players
Oakland Commuters players
Sacramento Senators players
Tacoma Tigers players
Fresno Raisin Eaters players
Oakland Oaks (baseball) players
Vernon Tigers players
Sacramento Baby Senators players
Richmond Colts players